Trox fascifer is a species of hide beetle in the family Trogidae. It is found in North America.

References

Further reading

 

fascifer
Articles created by Qbugbot
Beetles described in 1854